The 2018 NASCAR K&N Pro Series East was the 32nd season of the K&N Pro Series East, a regional stock car racing series sanctioned by NASCAR. It began with the New Smyrna 175 at New Smyrna Speedway on February 11 and concluded with the Crosley 125 at Dover International Speedway on October 6. Harrison Burton entered the season as the defending Drivers' champion. Tyler Ankrum won the championship, 84 points in front of Tyler Dippel.

Drivers

Notes

Schedule
On December 6, 2017, NASCAR announced the 2018 schedule. Greenville-Pickens and Berlin were dropped from the schedule in favor of Gateway and a second race at New Hampshire. All races in the season - with the exception of the race at New Jersey Motorsports Park, of which extended highlights were shown on NASCAR America - were televised on NBCSN on a tape delay basis. In addition the New Smyrna 175 and the Apple Barrel 125 were shown live on FansChoice.tv.

Notes

Results and standings

Races

Notes
1 – Starting grid was set by the fastest lap times from the first Who's Your Driver Twin 100 race.
2 – The qualifying session for the Great Outdoors RV Superstore 100 was cancelled due to weather. The starting line-up was decided by Owners' championship.
3 – The qualifying session for the Monaco Cocktails Gateway Classic 125 was cancelled due to weather. The starting line-up was decided by Practice results.

Drivers' championship

(key) Bold – Pole position awarded by time. Italics – Pole position set by final practice results or Owners' points. * – Most laps led.

Notes
1 – Bill Hoff and Brandon McReynolds received championship points, despite the fact that they did not start the race.
2 – Scored points towards the K&N Pro Series West.

See also

2018 Monster Energy NASCAR Cup Series
2018 NASCAR Xfinity Series
2018 NASCAR Camping World Truck Series
2018 NASCAR K&N Pro Series West
2018 NASCAR Whelen Modified Tour
2018 NASCAR Pinty's Series
2018 NASCAR PEAK Mexico Series
2018 NASCAR Whelen Euro Series

References

External links